Mahender Singh (born 22 February 1950) is an Indian politician. He is a member of the Bharatiya Janata Party (BJP). Singh was a member of the Himachal Pradesh Legislative Assembly from the Dharampur constituency in Mandi district. He holds the Irrigation and public health, Horticulture and Sainik welfare portfolios.

Early life

He is the son of the late Shri Bali Ram. He was born at Chanjyar (Richhli). He is married to Smt. Parmila Devi. The couple has one son and two daughters.

Initially, he was involved in the construction business.

Career 
He was elected to the State Legislative Assembly in February 1990 as an Independent. He was reelected in 1993 with the Indian National Congress, in 1998 with H.V.C., in 2003 with Lok Tantrik Morcha (H.P.), and in 2007 with BJP.

He served as Vice President of HVC from 1997 to 2002; President, H.P Lok Tantrik Morcha, from 2003 to 2004; Minister of Rural Development, Panchayati Raj, P.W.D., and Excise & Taxation from 1998 to 2000; and chairman, Estimates Committee and Member of various House Committees. He served as Transport Minister from 9 July 2009 until December 2012. He was elected to the State Legislative Assembly for the sixth time in 2012 and again in December 2017.

References 

People from Mandi district
Bharatiya Janata Party politicians from Himachal Pradesh
Living people
State cabinet ministers of Himachal Pradesh
Himachal Pradesh MLAs 2017–2022
1950 births
Himachal Pradesh MLAs 1990–1992
Himachal Pradesh MLAs 1993–1998
Himachal Pradesh MLAs 1998–2003
Himachal Pradesh MLAs 2003–2007
Himachal Pradesh MLAs 2007–2012
Himachal Pradesh MLAs 2012–2017
Himachal Vikas Congress politicians
21st-century Indian politicians